ASNSW may refer to:

 Ambulance Service of New South Wales
 Astronomical Society of New South Wales